Onigocia is a genus of marine ray-finned fishes belonging to the family Platycephalidae, the flatheads. They are found in the Indo-Pacific region.

Taxonomy
Onigoia was first proposed as a genus in 1913 by the American ichthyologists David Starr Jordan and William Francis Thompson with Platycephalus macrolepis, which had been described in 1925 by Pieter Bleeker from Nagasaki, as its type species. This genus is classified within the family Playtcephalidae, the flatheads which the 5th edition of Fishes of the World classifies within the suborder Platycephaloidei in the order Scorpaeniformes. The genus name Onigocia is a latinisation of onigogochi which translates as “devil flathead” the Japanese common name for O. spinosa. Gochi, which is also spelled kochi, is a general name in Japanese for flatheads and dragonets.

Species
There are currently 9 recognized species in this genus:

Characteristics
Onigocia is distinguished from other flathead genera by having finely serrated suborbital ridges and in the typically having less than 40 pored scales in the lateral line.

References

Marine fish genera
Platycephalidae
Taxa named by David Starr Jordan